Head Over Heels is the fifth studio album by Canadian electro-funk duo Chromeo. It was released on June 15, 2018, via Big Beat and Atlantic Records. The album features vocals from artists such as The-Dream, French Montana, Stefflon Don, DRAM and Amber Mark, with production work from producers such as Raphael Saadiq, Rodney Jerkins and Pino Palladino.

Background
The album was first announced in November 2017 and a release date for the album in April 2018. It consists of "talk-box–assisted pop songs about dating mishaps, comically disastrous relationships and anxiety-inducing sexual encounters." The album's recording process began 2 years before its release with Chromeo stating "...we were impatient to do the new record – so we spent the last two years working on this one [Head Over Heels]."

Speaking about the album, Chromeo said: "The mission statement for this album, for us, was to kind of pen this overarching love letter to funk music and the different kinds of funk music that have influenced us throughout the years since we discovered funk music when we were teenagers all the way until now... But it's also sort of, you know, going back to the real roots of funk. We made this one much more live, just a little less electronic than our previous two, three albums."

The artwork displays the legs of Chromeo members instead of a pair of women's legs, which is their signature symbol that has been on the artwork of previous albums.

A video for "Don't Sleep" was released on December 7, 2018.

In December 2018, Chromeo received their first Grammy nomination for Best Engineered Album, Non-Classical in the 61st Grammy Awards for the album.

Critical reception

Pitchfork described the album as "sound[ing] expert, expensive, accomplished, while being distasteful in almost everything else", rating it 5.7 out of 10. Rolling Stone described the album as consisting of moments that are "fleeting and aren't enough to make one fall head over heels", rating it with 3 out of 5 stars. Songs from the album were described as "chronicles of potential partner worship of goddess devotion" by Drowned in Sound. Slant Magazine called the album "White Women Part 2".

Track listing
Credits adapted from AllMusic.

Charts

References

2018 albums
Chromeo albums
Big Beat Records (American record label) albums
Albums produced by Jason Evigan